Trimerotropis maritima, known generally as the seaside grasshopper or seaside locust, is a species of band-winged grasshopper in the family Acrididae. It is found in Central America, North America, and the Caribbean.

References

External links

 

Oedipodinae
Articles created by Qbugbot
Insects described in 1841